The 2003–04 UEFA Futsal Cup was the 18th edition of Europe's premier club futsal tournament and the 3rd edition under the current UEFA Futsal Cup format.

Preliminary round

First qualifying round

Group 1

Group 2

Group 3

Group 4

Group 5

Group 6

Group 7

Group 8

Second qualifying round

Group A

Group B

Final

The 2004 UEFA Futsal Cup Final was played  on 24 April 2004 at the Pabellón Parque Corredor in Torrejón de Ardoz, Spain, and on 1 May 2004 at the Pavilhão da Luz Nº 1 in Lisbon, Portugal. Interviú won 7–5 on aggregate.

External links
 uefa.com

UEFA Futsal Champions League
Cup